Boi Loi Woods are located 25km northwest of Củ Chi District and 22km west of Bến Cát District in Hậu Nghĩa Province. The woods were an important base and staging area for the Viet Cong (VC) and later the PAVN.

US and Army of the Republic of Vietnam (ARVN) forces conducted frequent operations against PAVN and VC forces in the woods including Operation Mastiff (21-25 February 1966), Operation Wahiawa (16-30 May 1966), Operation Sunset Beach (2 September-11 October 1966), Operation Manhattan (23 April-7 June 1967), however none of these operations permanently cleared the PAVN/VC and the last attempt by the ARVN to penetrate the area occurred during the War of the flags (25 January-3 February 1973).

References

Base areas of the Viet Cong
Battlefields in Vietnam